Markenzy Lapointe is an American lawyer who serves as United States attorney for the Southern District of Florida since January 2023.

Early life and education 
Lapointe was born in Port-au-Prince, Haiti. Lapointe moved to Miami with his family at the age of 16. After graduating from Miami Edison Senior High School in 1987, he attended Miami Dade College and joined the United States Marine Corps Reserve. He earned a Bachelor of Science degree in finance from the Florida State University in 1993 and a Juris Doctor from the Florida State University College of Law in 1999.

Career 

From 1999 to 2001, he worked as a law clerk for Florida Supreme Court Justice Harry Lee Anstead. From 2002 to 2006, he served as an assistant United States attorney for the Southern District of Florida. Lapointe was a partner at Boies Schiller Flexner LLP and joined Pillsbury Winthrop Shaw Pittman as partner in 2017.

U.S. attorney for the Southern District of Florida 

On September 15, 2022, President Joe Biden nominated Lapointe to be the United States attorney for the Southern District of Florida. On December 1, 2022, his nomination was reported out of the Senate Judiciary Committee by voice vote. On December 6, 2022, his nomination was confirmed in the Senate by voice vote. He was sworn in on January 9, 2023 by Chief U.S. District Judge Cecilia Altonaga.

References 

Year of birth missing (living people)
Living people
20th-century American lawyers
21st-century American lawyers
Assistant United States Attorneys
Boies Schiller Flexner people
Florida lawyers
Florida State University alumni
Florida State University College of Law alumni
Haitian emigrants to the United States
People from Port-au-Prince
United States Attorneys for the Southern District of Florida